Demirışık (Turkish: "ironlight") may refer to the following places in Turkey:

 Demirışık, Bayburt, a village in the district of Bayburt, Bayburt Province
 Demirışık, Mezitli, a village in the district of Mezitli, Mersin Province